Mitrella mindoroensis is a species of sea snail in the family Columbellidae, the dove snails.

Description
The shell size ranges from 6 to 12 millimeters in length.

Distribution
This marine species occurs off the Philippines and in the Red Sea.

References

mindorensis
Gastropods described in 1859